Frank Wagner may refer to:
 Frank Wagner (politician), American politician in Virginia
 Frank D. Wagner (lawyer), American lawyer and Reporter of Decisions of the United States Supreme Court
 Frank D. Wagner (admiral), United States Navy admiral

See also
Frank Wagener (born 1952), chairman of the Luxembourg Stock Exchange